The 2011 BNP Paribas Primrose Bordeaux was a professional tennis tournament played on outdoor red clay courts. It was the fourth edition of the tournament. It was part of the 2011 ATP Challenger Tour. It took place in Bordeaux, France between May 7 and May 15, 2011.

Entrants

Seeds

 Rankings are as of May 2, 2011.

Other entrants
The following players received wildcards into the singles main draw:
  Jonathan Eysseric
  Marc Gicquel
  Romain Jouan
  Maxime Teixeira

The following players received entry as a special exempt into the singles main draw:
  Fernando González

The following players received entry from the qualifying draw:
  José Acasuso
  David Guez
  Stéphane Robert
  Carlos Salamanca

Champions

Singles

 Marc Gicquel def.  Horacio Zeballos, 6–2, 6–4

Doubles

 Jamie Delgado /  Jonathan Marray def.  Julien Benneteau /  Nicolas Mahut, 7–5, 6–3

External links
Official website
ITF search
ATP official site

2011 ATP Challenger Tour
2011 in French tennis
2011